Veri may refer to:

People
 Joseph Alphonse de Véri (1724–1799), French abbot
 Leandro Verì (1903–1938), Italian carabiniere
 Rinaldo Veri (born 1952), Italian naval officer

Places
 Jan Veri, Iran
 Veri, Azerbaijan, in Lerik District